The 2020–21 season was the 53rd season of the Northern Premier League. The league consists of three divisions, the Premier Division at Step 3 of the National League System, and the West and East Divisions at Step 4. 

As the previous season was terminated due to the COVID-19 pandemic, with all results removed, there were no changes in the allocations of teams for the Northern Premier League. The planned restructuring of the National League System, including the expansion of the Northern Premier League to include a further division at Step 4, was postponed until 2021–22.

For this season it was announced to member clubs that the League Cup would not take place during the season.

Due to the restrictions on clubs' ability to play matches in the COVID-19 lockdowns, competitions at Steps 3–6 were curtailed on 24 February 2021. The scheduled restructuring of non-league took place at the end of the season, with a new division added to the Northern Premier League at Step 4 for 2021–22. This resulted in 20 extra teams joining the league, either through promotions or reallocations, and some movement of teams currently in the two Division Ones.

Premier Division

Premier Division comprised the same set of 22 teams which competed in the aborted competition the previous season. On 1 June 2020, Mickleover Sports were renamed Mickleover F.C.

Premier Division table at the time of curtailment

Top 10 goalscorers

Updated to matches played on 3 November 2020

Results table

Stadia and locations

Division One North West

The division was renamed to Division One North West instead of Division One West from the previous season. Division One North West comprised 19 teams, one fewer than the previous season, following Droylsden's resignation from NPL.

Division One North-West table at the time of curtailment

Top 10 goalscorers

Updated to matches played on November 4th 2020

Results table

Stadia and locations

Division One South East

Division One South East comprised the same set of 20 teams which competed in the aborted competition the previous season.

Division One South-East table at the time of curtailment

Top 10 goalscorers

Updated to matches played on 3 November 2020

Results table

Stadia and locations

Challenge Cup

The 2020–21 Northern Premier League Challenge Cup, known as the 2020–21 Tysers League Cup for sponsorship reasons, did not take place due to the coronavirus pandemic-originated lockdowns.

The defending champions were Trafford.

See also
Northern Premier League
2020–21 Isthmian League
2020–21 Southern League

Notes

References

External links
Official website

Northern Premier League seasons
2020–21 in English football leagues
Eng
Eng